Lodewijk De Clerck (3 January 1936 – 13 February 2018) was a Belgian sprinter. He competed in the men's 400 metres at the 1960 Summer Olympics.

References

1936 births
2018 deaths
Athletes (track and field) at the 1960 Summer Olympics
Belgian male sprinters
Olympic athletes of Belgium
Place of birth missing